The Man in the High Castle is an American dystopian alternate history television series created for streaming service Amazon Prime Video, depicting a parallel universe where the Axis powers of Nazi Germany and the Empire of Japan rule the world after their victory in World War II. It was created by Frank Spotnitz and is produced by Amazon Studios, Ridley Scott's Scott Free Productions (with Scott serving as executive producer), Headline Pictures, Electric Shepherd Productions, and Big Light Productions. The series is based on Philip K. Dick's 1962 novel of the same name.

In a parallel universe, Germany and Japan have divided the United States into the Greater Nazi Reich in the east, with New York City as its regional capital, and the Japanese Pacific States to the west, with San Francisco as the capital. These territories are separated by a neutral zone that encompasses the Rocky Mountains. The series starts in 1962 and follows characters whose destinies intertwine when they come into contact with newsreels and home movies that show Germany and Japan losing the war. The series title refers to the mysterious figure believed to have created the footage.

The pilot premiered in January 2015, and Amazon ordered a ten-episode season the following month which was released in November. A second season of ten episodes premiered in December 2016, and a third season was released on October 5, 2018. The fourth and final season premiered on November 15, 2019.

Setting
Set in 1962, the series' main setting is a parallel universe where the Axis powers have won World War II in 1946 after Giuseppe Zangara assassinated the United States President-elect Franklin D. Roosevelt in 1933, which creates a series of developments that include the Germans dropping an atomic bomb on Washington, D.C. (now renamed "District of Contamination"). The German Reich extends to Europe and Africa and the Empire of Japan comprises Asia, but most of the series is set in the former US and in Germany proper.

Western North America, now part of the "Japanese Pacific States", is occupied by the technologically less-advanced Shōwa-period Empire of Japan, which has assimilated its formerly American citizens into Japanese culture, although high-class ethnic Japanese are extremely fascinated by pre-War American culture. Japan's Trade and Science ministers work in the Pacific States' capital, San Francisco. The Japanese rulers subject non-Japanese people to racial discrimination and grant them fewer rights.

Eastern and Midwestern North America is a colony controlled by the Greater Nazi Reich (GNR) under an aging  Adolf Hitler. The colony, headed by a " of North America", is commonly referred to as "Nazi America" or "the American Reich" and its capital is New York City. The Nazis continue to hunt minorities and euthanize the physically and mentally sick. The superior technology of the Germans is highlighted by the use of video phones and Concorde-like "rockets" for intercontinental travel.

A Neutral Zone, which encompasses the Rocky Mountains, serves as a buffer zone between the Japanese Pacific States and Nazi America due to Cold War–like tensions between the German and Japanese blocs. Another buffer zone is present in the Urals.

Films collected by the eponymous "Man in the High Castle" show views of numerous other Earths, including some where the Allies were victorious, some featuring executed Allied leaders (such as Winston Churchill and Joseph Stalin), and some where an American resistance is doing well.

Cast

Main
 Alexa Davalos as Juliana Crain, a young woman from San Francisco who is outwardly happy living under Japanese control. As Juliana learns of The Man in the High Castle and his films, she begins to rebel.
 Rupert Evans as Frank Frink (seasons 1–3), Juliana's boyfriend at the beginning of the series. He works in a factory creating replicas of prewar American pistols, and creates original jewelry and sketches on his own time. Frank's grandfather was Jewish, making him a target of discrimination. When Juliana vanishes just after the police kill her sister, Frank is taken into custody. Soon after, he turns against the state and works with the American Resistance.
 Luke Kleintank as Joe Blake (seasons 1–3), a new recruit to the underground American Resistance who is actually an agent working for the SS, under  John Smith. He transports a reel of the forbidden film The Grasshopper Lies Heavy to the neutral Rocky Mountain States as part of his mission to infiltrate the Resistance. He meets Juliana and quickly falls in love with her, leading to him questioning his allegiance to the Reich.
 DJ Qualls as Ed McCarthy (seasons 1–3), Frank's co-worker and friend. He closely follows politics and cares very much about Juliana and Frank's well-being. It is revealed in season three that Ed is gay.
 Joel de la Fuente as Chief Inspector Takeshi Kido, the ruthless head of the  stationed in San Francisco.
 Cary-Hiroyuki Tagawa as Nobusuke Tagomi (seasons 1–3), the Trade Minister of the Pacific States of America. His true loyalties are ambiguous throughout the first season.
He is a natural-born American who had served in the US Army Signal Corps. He initially lives a comfortable suburban life with a wife and three children but subsequently moves the family to Manhattan.
 Brennan Brown as Robert Childan (seasons 2–4; recurring season 1), an antique store owner who makes secret deals with Frank.
 Callum Keith Rennie as Gary Connell (season 2), leader of the West Coast Resistance movement and enforcer for Abendsen.
 Bella Heathcote as Nicole Dörmer (seasons 2–3), a young Berlin-born filmmaker who crosses paths with Joe, and moves to the US in season three.
 Chelah Horsdal as Helen Smith (season 3–4; recurring seasons 1–2), John's wife
 Michael Gaston as Mark Sampson (season 3; recurring season 1; guest season 2), a Jewish friend of Frank's living in San Francisco, who later relocates to the Neutral Zone.
 Jason O'Mara as Wyatt Price, also known as Liam (season 3–4), an Irishman who is a black market supplier of information to Juliana.
 Frances Turner as Bell Mallory (season 4), the leader of the Black Communist Rebellion (BCR) in San Francisco.

Recurring
 Aaron Blakely as Erich Raeder (seasons 1–3), an  working with Smith.
 Carsten Norgaard as Rudolph Wegener (season 1), a disillusioned high-ranking Nazi official who trades secrets with Tagomi.
 Rick Worthy as Lemuel "Lem" Washington, the owner of the Sunrise Diner in Canon City and member of the Resistance.
 Camille Sullivan as Karen Vecchione (seasons 1–2), a leader of the Pacific States branch of the Resistance.
 Lee Shorten as Sergeant Hiroyuki Yoshida (seasons 1–2), Inspector Kido's right-hand man.
 Arnold Chun as Kotomichi, Tagomi's aide-de-camp, who came from the parallel world after his hometown, Nagasaki, was destroyed by an American atomic bomb.
 Bernhard Forcher as Hugo Reiss (season 1), the German ambassador to the Japanese Pacific States.
 Christine Chatelain as Laura Crothers (season 1), Frank's sister, who is executed as a threat to force a confession from Frank.
 Hank Harris as Randall Becker (season 1), a member of the Pacific States branch of the Resistance.
 Allan Havey as the Origami Man (season 1), a Sicherheitsdienst (SD) operative sent to Canon City to eliminate members of the Resistance.
 Burn Gorman as the Marshal (season 1), a bounty hunter searching for concentration camp escapees.
 Shaun Ross as the Shoe Shine Boy (season 1), a young albino man living in Canon City.
 Rob LaBelle as Carl (season 1), a book store clerk in Canon City who is revealed to be a concentration camp escapee, David P. Frees.
 Geoffrey Blake as Jason Meyer (season 1), a Jewish member of the Resistance.
 Daisuke Tsuji as the Crown Prince of Japan (season 1)
 Mayumi Yoshida as the Crown Princess of Japan (seasons 1, 4)
 Amy Okuda as Christine Tanaka (season 1), an office worker working in the Nippon Building.
 Neal Bledsoe as Captain Connolly (season 1), an American SS officer serving under John Smith, later revealed to be a spy working for Reinhard Heydrich.
 Hiro Kanagawa as Taishi Okamura (seasons 1–2), the leader of a  based in the Pacific States.
 Louis Ozawa Changchien as Paul Kasoura (seasons 1–2), a wealthy lawyer who collects prewar American memorabilia.
 Tao Okamoto as Betty Kasoura (season 1), Paul's wife.
 Stephen Root as Hawthorne Abendsen / The Man in the High Castle (seasons 2–4), the head of the American antifascist resistance, creating films set in other worlds.
 Sebastian Roché as  Martin Heusmann (seasons 2–3), Joe's estranged father and a high-ranking member in the Nazi government.
 Cara Mitsuko as Sarah (season 2), a Japanese American Resistance member, Frank's confidante and a survivor of the Manzanar  concentration camp.
 Tate Donovan as George Dixon (season 2), Trudy's biological father and a member of the resistance in New York City.
 Michael Hogan as Hagan (seasons 2–3), an ex-priest and leader in the San Francisco Resistance.
 Tzi Ma as General Hidehisa Onoda (season 2), a leading member of the Japanese Army.
 Giles Panton as Billy Turner (season 3–4), a Nazi Reich American advertising executive who is working with Nicole Dörmer to "erase" the memories of the former U.S. from the minds of the citizens in the Nazi Reich America.
 Ann Magnuson as Caroline Abendsen (season 3–4), the wife of Hawthorne Abendsen.
 Laura Mennell as Thelma Harris (season 3), a closeted lesbian gossip column reporter in New York City.
 Janet Kidder as Lila Jacobs (season 3), one of the many Jews protected in a Catholic commune in the Neutral Zone.
 Jeffrey Nordling as Dr. Daniel Ryan (season 3), a Jungian therapist employed to treat Helen Smith's grief following the death of her son Thomas.
 Akie Kotabe as Sergeant Nakamura (season 3), a Japanese-American of mixed ethnicity who works under Kido as Yoshida's replacement.
 Tamlyn Tomita as Tamiko Watanabe (season 3–4), an Okinawan-Hawaiian painter who befriends Tagomi.
 Eijiro Ozaki as Admiral Inokuchi (season 3–4), the head of the Imperial Japanese Navy fleet stationed in the San Francisco Bay.
 James Neate as Jack (season 3), a man in the Neutral Zone with whom Ed McCarthy becomes romantically involved.
 Sen Mitsuji as Toru Kido (season 4), Inspector Kido's son who suffers from PTSD.
 Chika Kanamoto as Yukiko (season 4), Childan's assistant and later wife.
 Clé Bennett as Elijah (season 4), Bell Mallory's lover and one of the members of the BCR.
 David Harewood as Equiano Hampton (season 4), the leader of the BCR.
 Rachel Nichols as Martha (season 4), Helen Smith's "wife-companion" assigned by the Reich to keep an eye on her.
 Michael Hagiwara as Okami (season 4), a Yakuza boss operating in the JPS.
 Bruce Locke as General Yamori (season 4), a hardline Japanese general in favour of continuing the occupation of the JPS.
 Eric Lange as General Whitcroft (season 4), John Smith's second-in-command.
 Rich Ting as Captain Iijima (season 4)

John Smith's family
 Quinn Lord as Thomas Smith, John and Helen's son and the eldest child. A member of the Hitler Youth, it is later revealed that he has inherited a form of muscular dystrophy (facioscapulohumeral muscular dystrophy) from his father's side of the family. Learning this, he turns himself in to the Reich Sanitation Services and is euthanized. In season four, Lord plays Thomas in an alternate universe where the Axis lost WWII.
 Gracyn Shinyei as Amy Smith, John and Helen's daughter.
 Genea Charpentier as Jennifer Smith, John and Helen's daughter.

Juliana Crain's family
 Daniel Roebuck as Arnold Walker (seasons 1–2), Juliana's stepfather and Trudy's father.
 Macall Gordon as Anne Crain Walker (seasons 1–2), Juliana's mother who is still bitter about losing her husband in World War II.
 Conor Leslie as Trudy Walker (seasons 1–3), Juliana's half-sister who is shot dead by the Kempeitai. However, she is shown alive at the end of the second season, revealed in the third season to be from an alternate timeline in which it was Juliana who died.

Nobusuke Tagomi's family
 Yukari Komatsu as Michiko Tagomi (season 2), Nobusuke's wife.
 Eddie Shin as Noriaki Tagomi (season 2), Nobusuke and Michiko's son.

Historical characters
 Wolf Muser as Adolf Hitler (seasons 1–2), the leader of the Greater Nazi Reich.
 Ray Proscia as  Reinhard Heydrich (seasons 1–2).
 Keone Young as Field Marshal Shunroku Hata (season 1).
 Lisa Paxton as Eva Braun (season 2), Hitler's wife, at his side on his deathbed.
 William Forsythe as J. Edgar Hoover (seasons 3–4), Director of the American Reich Bureau of Investigation (the Nazi counterpart of the real-life FBI), co-plotting with Rockwell.
 John Hans Tester as Dr. Josef Mengele (seasons 3–4), the head of the studies about trans-universe travel, realising an enormous traveling machine.
 Gwynyth Walsh as Margarete Himmler (season 4), Himmler's wife and the head of the Reich Red Cross.
 Timothy V. Murphy as SS-Oberst-Gruppenführer Adolf Eichmann (season 4)
 Hiromoto Ida as the Japanese emperor Hirohito (season 4)

Episodes

Season 1 (2015)

Season 2 (2016)

Season 3 (2018)

Season 4 (2019)

Production
In 2010, it was announced that the BBC would co-produce a four-part TV adaptation of The Man in the High Castle for BBC One together with Headline Pictures, FremantleMedia Enterprises and Scott Free Films. Director Ridley Scott was to act as executive producer of the adaptation by Howard Brenton. On February 11, 2013, Variety reported that Syfy was producing the book as a four-part miniseries, with Frank Spotnitz and Scott as executive producers, co-produced with Scott Free Productions, Headline Pictures and Electric Shepherd Prods.

On October 1, 2014, Amazon Studios began filming the pilot episode for a potential television drama to be broadcast on their Prime web video streaming service. Adapted by Spotnitz, the project was produced for Amazon by Scott, David Zucker and Jordan Sheehan for Scott Free, Stewart Mackinnon and Christian Baute for Headline Pictures, Isa Hackett and Kalen Egan for Electric Shepherd and Spotnitz's Big Light Productions. The pilot was released by Amazon Studios on January 15, 2015. Amazon Studios' production process is somewhat different from those of other conventional television channels in that they produce pilot episodes of a number of different prospective programs, then release them and gather data on their success. The most promising shows are then picked up as regular series. On February 18, 2015, Amazon announced that The Man in the High Castle was green-lit along with four other series, and a full season would be produced.

The pilot, which premiered in January 2015, was Amazon's "most-watched since the original series development program began". The next month, Amazon ordered a ten-episode season, which was released in November to positive reviews. A second season of ten episodes premiered in December 2016, and a third season was announced a few weeks later. Amazon announced in January 2017 that they were bringing on new executive producer and showrunner Eric Overmyer for the third season to replace Spotnitz, who had departed from the show during the second season. Season three was released on October 5, 2018. In July 2018, it was announced at San Diego Comic-Con that the series had been renewed for a fourth season, which was confirmed in February 2019 to be the last one of the series. Daniel Percival and David Scarpa took over as showrunners for the final season.

Filming
Principal filming for the pilot took place in Seattle, with the city standing in for San Francisco and locations in New York City. Filming also took place in Roslyn, Washington, with the town standing in for Canon City and other Neutral Zone locations. Sites used in Seattle include the Seattle Center Monorail, the Paramount Theatre, a newspaper office in the Pike Place Market area, as well as various buildings in the city's Capitol Hill, International District, and Georgetown neighborhoods. In Roslyn, the production used external shots of the Roslyn Cafe, along with several local businesses and scenery.

For the series, filming took place in Vancouver, British Columbia. Specific filming locations included West Georgia Street in the city's downtown core, and the promenade of the Coast Capital Savings building in April 2015. In May and June 2015, filming also took place at the University of British Columbia. Exterior shots of Hohenwerfen Castle in Werfen, Austria, were filmed in September 2015 for the tenth episode of the first season. The interior scene where Hitler and Rudolph Wegener meet was shot on the ground floor of the Bell Tower.

Release
The first and second episodes were screened at a special Comic-Con event. The season premiered on November 20, 2015. The second season was released on December 16, 2016. The third season was released on October 5, 2018. The fourth season was released on November 15, 2019.

Reception

The pilot was Amazon's "most-watched since the original series development program began". The first season received critical acclaim. Rotten Tomatoes gives it an approval rating of 95% based on reviews from 62 critics, with an average rating of 7.5 out of 10. The site's critical consensus states, "By executive producer Ridley Scott, The Man in the High Castle is unlike anything else on TV, with an immediately engrossing plot driven by quickly developed characters in a fully realized post-WWII dystopia." Metacritic gives the first season a score of 77 out of 100, based on reviews from 30 critics, indicating "generally favorable reviews". Meredith Woerner from io9 wrote, "I can honestly say I loved this pilot. It's an impressive, streamlined undertaking of a fairly complicated and very beloved novel." Matt Fowler from IGN gave it 9.2 out of 10 and described the series as "a superb, frightening experience filled with unexpected twists and (some sci-fi) turns". Brian Moylan of The Guardian was positive and praised the convincing depiction as well as the complex and gripping plot. The Los Angeles Times described the pilot as "provocative" and "smartly adapted by The X-Files' Frank Spotnitz". The Daily Telegraph said it was "absorbing", and Wired called it "must-see viewing". Entertainment Weekly said it was "engrossing" and "a triumph in world-building", cheering, "The Man in the High Castle is king." After the season, Rolling Stone included it on a list of the 40 best science fiction television shows of all time. Amazon subsequently announced it was the service's most-streamed original series and had been renewed for a second season.

The second season received mixed reviews. Rotten Tomatoes gives it an approval rating of 64%, based on reviews from 25 critics with an average rating of 7 out of 10. The site's critical consensus states, "Although its plot is admittedly unwieldy, The Man in the High Castles second season expands its fascinating premise in powerful new directions, bolstered by stunning visuals, strong performances, and intriguing new possibilities." Metacritic gave season 2 a score of 62 out of 100, based on reviews from ten critics, indicating "generally favorable reviews".

The third season was met with positive reviews. Rotten Tomatoes gives it an approval rating of 86%, based on reviews from 21 critics with an average rating of 7.4 out of 10. The site's critical consensus states, "The crafty addition of minor sci-fi elements and a terrific William Forsythe to the show's already engrossing narrative make The Man in the High Castles third season another worthy binge." Metacritic gives season 3 a score of 70 out of 100, based on reviews from five critics, indicating "generally favorable reviews".

The fourth season received positive reviews. Rotten Tomatoes gives it an approval rating of 92%, based on reviews from 13 critics with an average rating of 7.2 out of 10. The site's critical consensus states, "The Man in the High Castle finds something close to closure, wrapping up major threads to bring everything full circle in sufficiently dramatic fashion."

Accolades

Advertising controversy
As part of an advertising campaign for the season 1 release, an entire New York City Subway car was covered with Nazi and Imperial Japanese imagery, as seen in the show, including multiple US flags with the Imperial Eagle symbol in place of the 50 stars (a change from the swastika used on the flag in the show), and multiple flags of the fictional Pacific States.
In response to criticism from "state lawmakers and city leaders", the Metropolitan Transportation Authority (MTA) released a statement saying that there were no grounds to reject the ads because the neutral content subway ad standards prohibit only advertising that is a political advertisement or disparages an individual or group. MTA spokesperson Kevin Ortiz stated, "The MTA is a government agency and can't accept or reject ads based on how we feel about them; we have to follow the standards approved by our board. Please note they're commercial ads." Spokesperson Adam Lisberg said, "This advertising, whether you find it distasteful or not, obviously they're not advertising Nazism; they're advertising a TV show."

After complaints from New York State Governor Andrew Cuomo and New York City Mayor Bill de Blasio, initial reports indicated that Amazon pulled the advertisement from the subway. It was later announced that it was the MTA, not Amazon, that pulled the ad because of pressure from Cuomo.

See also
 Fatherland, 1994 TV film
 The Plot Against America, 2020 miniseries
 SS-GB, 2017 TV series
 Noughts + Crosses, 2020 TV series

References

External links

2010s American drama television series
2010s American science fiction television series
2015 American television series debuts
2019 American television series endings
Alternate history television series
Anti-fascist works
Amazon Prime Video original programming
Cultural depictions of Adolf Hitler
Cultural depictions of Heinrich Himmler
Cultural depictions of J. Edgar Hoover
Cultural depictions of Josef Mengele
Dystopian television series
Imperial Japanese Army
Television shows based on works by Philip K. Dick
Television series about Nazis
Television series about Nazism
Television series about nuclear war and weapons
Television series about parallel universes
Television series about World War II alternate histories
Television series by Amazon Studios
Television series by Scott Free Productions
Television shows filmed in Vancouver
Television series set in 1962
Television series set in 1963
Television series set in 1964
Television shows directed by Steph Green
Television shows filmed in Washington (state)
Television shows set in Colorado
Television shows set in New York City
Television shows set in San Francisco
Television shows scored by Henry Jackman
Works about the Yakuza